OOTB may refer to:

Out of the Blue (Oxford University), an a cappella group
Out of the Blue (Yale University), an a cappella group
Out of the Blue (Electric Light Orchestra album), 1977
Out of the box (feature), a functionality of a product that works immediately after installation
Thinking out of the box

See also
 Out of the Box (disambiguation)